V Sagittae or V Sge is a cataclysmic variable binary star system in the constellation Sagitta that is expected to go nova and briefly become the most luminous point of light in the Milky Way and one of the brightest stars in our sky around the year 2083. The system is composed of a main sequence star of about 3.3 solar masses and a white dwarf of about 0.9 solar masses; the fact that the white dwarf is less massive than its companion is highly unusual, and V Sge is the only super soft X-ray source nonmagnetic cataclysmic variable found so far.

V Sge has brightened by a factor of 10 over the last century, and based on research reported in 2020, it is expected to continue to brighten and briefly become the brightest star in the night sky sometime around 2083, plus or minus about 11 years. Over the final few months and days the pair will coalesce and go nova, eventually becoming a red giant star.

The stars orbit each other about every 0.514 days, and eclipse each other each orbit. The pair is viewed in the late stages of their spiral in. Their orbital period currently decreases by 4.73 * 10−10 days per cycle, a rate which will accelerate.

Material from the larger star is accreting onto the white dwarf at an exponentially increasing rate, generating a huge stellar wind. The doubling time for the accretion rate, and hence for the system luminosity, is about 89 years.

References

Cataclysmic variable stars
Sagitta (constellation)
Sagitta, V
Eclipsing binaries
21st century in space